Typewriting Behavior is a book by August Dvorak, Nellie Merrick, William Dealey and Gertrude Ford.  It was published in 1936 by the American Book Company. It is currently out of print but can be found in most major libraries.

The book is a study on the psychology of typing.  It gives a scientific approach to teaching and learning typewriting, from personalities to patterns and machine effects.  It gives an in depth overview on the subject of typing.

This book also introduced the Dvorak Simplified Keyboard.

References
 Dvorak, Merrick, Dealey and Ford (1936) Typewriting Behavior: Psychology applied to teaching and learning Typewriting.  American Book Company, New York, USA.
 google books reference

Typewriters
1936 non-fiction books
American Book Company (1890) books